The Alvis Stormer is a military armoured vehicle manufactured by the British company Alvis Vickers, now BAE Systems Land & Armaments. 

The Stormer is a development of the CVR(T) family of vehicles (Scorpion, Scimitar, Spartan etc.), essentially a larger, modernised version with an extra road-wheel on each side.

Variants
Like most modern AFVs, Stormer can be produced in several different configurations for different battlefield roles. It is marketed by BAE as being available in several configurations, such as a two-person turret armed with a 25 mm cannon, air defence (with guns or missiles), an engineer vehicle, a recovery vehicle, an ambulance, a mine layer, an 81 mm or 120 mm mortar carrier, a command and control vehicle, a bridge layer, and a logistics vehicle. 

Optional equipment includes a nuclear-biological-chemical protection system, an amphibious kit, passive night-vision equipment, and an air-conditioning system.

Specific types are:

Stormer HVM
The British Army use Stormer equipped with High Velocity Missile (HVM) – the Starstreak and Martlet (missile) aka Lightweight Multirole Missile for short-range air defence. Under the Army 2020 plan for the British armed forces, Stormer HVM was to equip three regular and two reserve artillery batteries. The reserve batteries have since all been converted to HVM Lightweight Multiple Launcher (LML) to reduce the training burden. 

There are reports the Stormer HVM is being supplied to Ukraine. Six had arrived by July 24, 2022, according to the Ukrainian army. On March 11, 2023, the Russian Ministry of Defense released video footage showing the Stormer HVM being destroyed by a Lancet loitering munition.

Flat bed Stormer

A transport version of the Stormer with a flat load bed is used to carry the Shielder minelaying system.

Stormer 30
Stormer 30 is a development of the Stormer chassis as a tracked reconnaissance vehicle. It is a turreted version of the Stormer. It is armed with a 30 mm Bushmaster II automatic cannon. A TOW missile launcher can be fitted to either turret side. The cannon and turret can traverse through 360°. The elevation is from -45° to +60°.

The rate of fire of the cannon is from single shot to a maximum of 200 rounds per minute. The cannon has a double selection ammunition feed system with 180 rounds of ammunition ready to fire.

The vehicle remains in the prototype stage and it is unclear when it will enter service. The vehicle will be fully air transportable by Lockheed C-130 Hercules used by the Royal Air Force aircraft as well as the Sikorsksy CH-53 helicopter currently in service with NATO allies and other nations across the world.

Stormer Air Defence
The Stormer Air Defence was a prototype air defence vehicle built in the late 1980s. This variant was to mount a dual Stinger launcher, as well as either a 25 mm GAU-12/U or 30 mm GAU-13/A cannon.

Operators

Current
  - 40
  - 4 Stormers purchased in 1993.
 
  - An unspecified number of Stormer vehicles (at least 6), including Stormer HVM vehicles, were sent from the UK to Ukraine during the 2022 Russian invasion. Ukrainian soldiers were trained in the UK to use armoured vehicles of various types that were supplied. The Stormer saw use against Shahed 13x-series drones.
  - 151

Former

  - 25 (retired)

Notes

External links

 Stormer - Light Armoured Vehicles - Jane's Land Forces

Armoured fighting vehicles of the United Kingdom
Reconnaissance vehicles of the United Kingdom
Alvis Stormer HVM
Stormer